Murphy-Hoffman Company (MHC) is a privately owned multi-state network of truck dealerships and leasing locations, providing truck-related services. Founded in Springfield, Missouri, as of 2022 it is based in Leawood, Kansas.

History 

MHC was founded on January 1, 1975, in Springfield Mo., as Ozark Kenworth, Inc. by Reed Murphy Senior, and Ken Hoffman. For over 45 years, the company grew from a temporary facility with only three employees to operating across 19 states with 120 locations, including dealerships, full-service transport refrigeration locations, full-service leasing and rental operations, TRP part retail stores and a finance company.

Business 

MHC’s divisions support the heavy and medium duty truck industry with dealerships, truck leasing and rental dealerships, transport refrigeration dealerships and MHC Financial Services.

Truck Dealerships 

MHC operates over 70 truck dealerships, which offer new and used truck sales, all-makes parts inventory, technicians and service bays. Technicians are trained for PACCAR, Cummins and Caterpillar engines, and Eaton and Dana components, to service all makes of trucks, including Kenworth, Volvo, Freightliner, Peterbilt, Mack, International, Western Star, Hino, Isuzu, Ford and GMC. Parts and service are available seven days a week, 24 hours a day at most MHC locations. The company offers on-site delivery for all makes including Kenworth, Volvo, Freightliner, Peterbilt, Mack, International and Western Star.

Truck Leasing and Rental 

MHC Truck Leasing manages more than 4,700 trucks for a wide range of businesses. Leasing plans range from full-service truck leases to contract maintenance programs. In addition, short-term and long-term rental trucks are available. There are over 25 MHC Truck Leasing locations which are also part of PacLease’s network of more than 480 leasing locations.

Transport Refrigeration 

MHC runs four Carrier-Transicold dealerships that carry an array of replacement parts for both Carrier and Thermo King refrigeration units, as well as provide emergency mobile service seven days a week, 24 hours a day. Technicians design and install multi-temp systems that are monitored by data logging systems to reduce customer operating costs and increase efficiencies.

Financial Services 

MHC Financial Services, Inc., is MHC’s wholly owned finance company.

Reception 

MHC has earned Kenworth’s North American Dealer of the Year Award over 14 times in the last 30 years. The company has also received the Kansas City Business Journal’s Champions of Business Award two times in the last five years.

Operations 

Additionally, the company owns and operates its RoadReady Center, a pre-delivery inspection facility in Chillicothe, Ohio, Truck Source, a network of used truck dealerships, RoadForce, a private all-makes parts label, and the first TRP All-Makes Parts and Service store  in Grandview, Mo.

See also 
 PACCAR
 Kenworth
 Class 8 Trucks
 Semi-trailer truck
 Dump truck
 Hino
 Ford
 Volvo

External links 
 MHC Kenworth

References 

Springfield, Missouri
Companies based in Kansas
American companies established in 1975